The Kingdom of Rohilkhand was a Indo-Muslim state, nominally under Mughal suzerainty, that arose under the declining Mughal Empire in 1721 and continued to exist until 1774 when annexation by the British transformed its significantly reduced borders into the Princely State of Rampur. Nawab Ali Mohammed Khan became the first Nawab of Rohilkhand, having been previously elected as overlord by various Afghan Chiefs at the age of fourteen. He would carve out the future kingdom from the collapsing Mughal Empire and go on to the found the Rohilla dynasty. The crown would go on being held by the Rohillas until the kingdom came to an end in 1774, and thereafter the same dynasty would rule over Rampur.

Most of Rohilkhand's borders were established by Ali Mohammed Khan and largely came into existence as a check to the power of Oudh State and in that capacity, Nawab Ali Mohammed was supported by the Wazir al Mulk, Qamarudin Khan. Nonetheless, the state grew far more influential with its borders extending to the boundaries of Delhi and Agra. In 1772, Rohillas defeated a much larger Maratha force with aid of Nawab of Oudh. However, when they could not repay the debt, Nawab of Oudh invaded Rohilkhand in 1773. Most of the kingdom was annexed at the end of the First Rohilla War into Oudh, when the mismanagement of Hafiz Rehmat Khan along with the internal division of the Rohilla Confederation led to the weakening of central authority.

Origin 
Ali Mohammed Khan was an enterprising soldier who established the kingdom of Rohilkhand. Rohillas are Afghans who migrated to north India during the 17th and 18th centuries. However, the  Rohilla dynasty descended from  Nawab Ali Muhammed Khan, who was a Jat boy of age eight when he was adopted by the chief of the Barech tribe, Sardar Daud Khan Rohilla.  Daud Khan was the son Shah Alam who was a son of Mahmud of Kandahar. He belonged to the Barech tribe and to a family that was noted for its sanctity. He rose to a position of prominence in Katehir, heading a militia of Afghans and adopted Ali Mohammed as his son. After his murder by the Raja of Kumaon, Ali Mohammed rose as the 14-year-old leader of his foster father's militia. Due to the role he played in the establishment of Rohilkhand and in the general history of Rohillas, he gained recognition as a Rohilla chief, although he was not Afghan by birth. In the 19th century, descendants of Ali Mohammed Khan, specifically the Nawabs of Rampur, started claiming that he was a Barha Sayyid and began using the title of Sayyid. However, they could not present any pedigree or valid historical proof in the support of this claim. The Nawabs even sought service of a prominent religious leader of Rampur, Najmul Ghani for establishing ancestry from Ali, which was widely rejected.

Etymology 
The ancient name for Rohilkhand was Katehir. The name Rohilkhand was applied in the middle of the eighteenth century when it fell into the hands of the Rohilla Dynasty started by Nawab Ali Mohammad Khan Bahadur Rohilla. Although the term Rohilla was previously used by Afghans who arrived in India.

Geography 
Located on the Eastern side of the Ganges, Rohilkhand lies over much of the plain that eventually leads to Oudh. There is no natural barrier between Oudh and Rohilkhand and both share a damp climate due to their locality next to the Himalayan Mountain range. Both also have more luxuriant vegetation than the surrounding areas, and were much known for the greater abundance of wood. The visibility of the snowy Himalayan Mountain tops gave an overall pleasant aspect to the territory.

Immediately below the mountains, there was a forest consisting of sand and boulders without any river running through it but instead the water would be absorbed and would appear about 10–12 miles later towards the end of the forest. This forest of Bhabar, no longer exists in present times but previously it led up to a swamp where the water would reappear at the surface. This swamp with its tall reeds was famous for its Tigers as well as its seasonal fevers. It was known as Tarai and crucially it formed a place of refuge for the people of Rohilkhand during times of invasion.  Tarai extends for a breadth of 10 miles and during the era of the Kingdom of Rohilkhand it was better cultivated, especially as it formed a valuable retreat for the people. It was often used as a source of shelter by the rulers of Rohilkhand especially as the terrain made it difficult for an enemy army to pursue.

During winter months, the cessation of floods from the rainy season cease, and subsequent fordability of the Ganges opened Rohilkhand to foreign attack, often in the form of their arch-enemies the Marathas.

At the time of its annexation, Rohilkhand represented an area of 12,000 square miles, with a population of 6 million people. It extended from Haridwar to Oudh.

History
In the beginning of the 18th century, Afghans had migrated to the region in a large number and often sought employment under the Mughal Empire, especially in the military. However, with the death of Aurangzeb and subsequent collapse of administration under the emperor Muhammad Shah, Mughal Authority in the area collapsed. The Mughal authority was further weakened by Nader Shah's invasion of India.

Ali Mohammed Khan 

A man of ability and courage, Ali Mohammed Khan attracted many afghan adventurers by his great reputation and arose as the most powerful man in Katehir. He gained favour with the lower rungs of society and by the invasion of Nadir Shah in 1739 he further strengthened his position with a large swath of afghans taking employment with him. By 1740 he was officially recognised by the Emperor Muhammad Shah as governor. For the subsequent five years, his authority was left unchallenged. 

In 1745 a quarrel arose between Ali Mohammed and Safdar Jang the Subedar of Oudh. Retainers of Ali Mohammed seized the property of servants belonging to Safdar Jang. Safdar Jang who was already jealous at the growing power of Ali Mohammad went to the Emperor Muhammad Shah, and through him ordered the return of the confiscated property as well as the arrest of the Rohillas in-charge of the confiscation. After the refusal of Ali Mohammed, Safdar Jang led an Imperial expedition together with the Emperor present in person and after being deserted by his men Ali Mohammed was captured and taken to Delhi.

He was treated honourably and respectfully by the Emperor, in large part due to his influence among his adherent who were still at large. The necessity to consulate Ali Mohammed led to his appointment as Governor of Sirhind (the area between Jummuna and Sutlej).

In 1748 the invasion by Ahmed Shah Abidali allowed Ali Mohammed the opportunity to return to Katehir and re-establish his rule. Upon his return, he was rejoined by most of his former men and soon he was virtually independent in his control of Rohilkhand. To ensure loyalty almost all positions of power were given to Afghan and several like Najib-ad-daula received land grants.

Rohilla Council 

On his death-bed Nawab Ali Mohammad Khan made the previously humble and lowly Rohilla, Hafiz Rehmat Khan as Guardian of Rohilkhand until his sons reached majority. Ali Mohammad's cousin Dunde Khan was made Commander-in-chief, Niamut Khan and Silabat Khan were entrusted with the General Administration. Futte Khan who was Ali's favourite retainer was made Khanfaman, while Sirdar Khan was made Bakshi or Paymaster. All of these men were granted districts to rule over as a trust until the majority of his Ali Muhammad children but these trusts were quickly usurped by most of these men upon the death of the Nawab.

Ali Mohammad's capital was Aolna, in the district of Bareilly. After his death in 1749, Rehmat Khan became the 'Hafiz' or chief guardian of his sons during their minority. Ali Mohammad left six sons, Faizullah Khan and Abdullah Khan being elder sons. Before his death, he made arrangements to divide the Kingdom among them and asked Rehmat Khan to make solemn assurance and swore upon Koran to observe the promise. However in 1754, Hafiz Rehmat resolved no longer to regard the pledges and appropirated to themselves most valuable portions of Rohilkhand. The larger share was taken by Hafiz Rehmat and he virtually became the ruler. Smaller districts were assigned to Faizullah Khan and Abdullah Khan, elder sons of Ali Mohammad, and to several influential chiefs. This led to a confederation-like structure of government with the Nawab of Rohilkhand at its head and the Rohilla Chiefs in charge of their own Rohilla States answering to him especially in regards to military engagements.

Although the council carried out to an extent its purpose, especially in the form of Najib-ad-Daula who often went to great lengths in securing Rohilkhand's safety and Futtee Khan who remained loyal to the royal family. Ultimately Rehmat Khan and Dundi Khan's machinations won out and Ali Mohammed Khan's children were in large part sidelined in the new government. Hafiz Rehmat died in 1774 Rohilla War and Faizullah Khan, eldest surviving son in the war became the newly acknowledged head. He signed a treaty where he retained his former territory in Rampur. Thus, The Rohilla State of Rampur was established by Nawab Faizullah Khan on 7 October 1774 in the presence of British Commander Colonel Champion, and remained a pliant state under British protection thereafter.

Rohilla States 
The weakening of the central government led to the formation of around a dozen Rohilla states. Four of these states were created during the division of Rohilkhand at the request of the Afghan emperor, Ahmed Shah Abidali, for the sons of Nawab Ali Muhammad Khan:
Badaun (Nawab Abdullah Khan) 
Moradabad (Nawab Saadullah Khan) 
Rampur (Nawab Faizullah Khan)
Bareilly (Nawab Muhammad Yar Khan)

Many Rohilla chiefs also became independent after 1748. Notable Rohilla chieftancies included:
Najibabad (Nawab Najib ad Daula)
Farrukhabad (Muhammad Khan Bangash)
Pilibhit (Hafiz Rehmat Khan)

First Rohilla War

Rohillas had sought assistance from the Nawab of Oudh Shuja-ud-Daula in 1772 to expel out Marathas from Rohilkhand. However, they couldn't pay their debt back and in 1773, the Nawab decided to annex their country. He appealed to Warren Hastings for assistance, which was given in return for a sum of forty lakhs of rupees. The Rohillas under Hafiz Rahmat Ali Khan were defeated by Colonel Alexander Champion on 23 April 1774 at the Battle of Miranpur Katra. The decisive battle, in which Hafiz Rahmat Khan died, caused the Rohillas to flee to the mountains near Loll Dong. Rohilkhand fell to Awadh, was plundered and occupied. The majority of the Rohillas left. A Rohilla state under British protection was set up in Rampur, and Faizullah Khan managed to become its Nawab. The kingdom of Rohilkhand was abolished, and afterwards became part of Oudh State.

List of Nawabs

Demographics 
There was an unusually large proportion of Muslim converts who represented a quarter of the population while the majority of the inhabitants were Hindu.

References 

States and territories established in 1721
States and territories established in 1774
Rohilkhand
Rohilla
Rampur, Uttar Pradesh
Islamic rule in the Indian subcontinent